Universidad de las Américas (University of the Americas) may refer to:

Universidad de las Américas, A.C., a bilingual university in Mexico City, Mexico.
Universidad de las Américas Puebla, a Mexican private university in San Andrés Cholula, near Puebla
Universidad de las Américas, Spanish name for University of the Americas (Chile), a private university based in Santiago
Universidad de las Américas, Spanish name for University of the Americas (Nicaragua), a private university based in Managua
Universidad de las Américas (Ecuador), a private university based in Quito.